John Stewart Dalrymple III (born October 16, 1948) is an American politician and businessman who served as the 32nd Governor of North Dakota from 2010 to 2016. A member of the Republican Party, he previously served as the 36th Lieutenant Governor of North Dakota from 2000 to 2010 under Governor John Hoeven.

Dalrymple assumed the governorship following Hoeven's election to the United States Senate. Prior to his inauguration as North Dakota Lieutenant Governor, Dalrymple served in the North Dakota House of Representatives for the 22nd district for eight consecutive terms, from 1985 through 2000. He was a candidate for the U.S. Senate twice, in 1988 and 1992.

Early life
Dalrymple was born on October 16, 1948, in Minneapolis, Minnesota, the son of Mary Josephine (Knoblauch) and John Stewart Dalrymple Jr. He spent many of his formative years in Casselton, North Dakota, on his family's wheat farm, which was established in 1875 by his great-grandfather, Oliver Dalrymple.

At age 7, when Dalrymple was in elementary school in 1955, his grandfather, John Stewart Dalrymple, Oliver's son, "still owned about 25,000 acres of farmland". In 1966, he graduated from The Blake School, a private co-educational day school, where he took the preparatory course to earn his high school diploma.

Heading to Connecticut for college as a legacy student, Dalrymple graduated with honors from Yale College with the Class of 1970, with an A.B. in American Studies.

Agricultural career
Dalrymple returned after graduation to North Dakota, going to work managing the family's Dalrymple Farm in the Red River Valley, a durum wheat producer in the Casselton area.

Dalrymple was named the Outstanding Young Farmer of the United States of America in 1983 by Outstanding Farmers of America (OFA).

He was the founding board chairman of Dakota Growers Pasta Company, formed as an agricultural cooperative of more than 1,100 primarily North Dakota wheat growers in 1992. The cooperative grew to become North America's third-largest manufacturer and marketer of dry pasta products. Dakota Growers Pasta provides an array of products for retail brands, retail private label and food service. Dalrymple led the transition of the structure of the organization, from a cooperative to a C corporation, to raise capital and to perform acquisitions. Dakota Growers Pasta was sold in May 2010 for about $240 million to a Canadian firm, Viterra Inc. Opposition to the Viterra sale was largely due to the fact that "the cooperative was created with the help of the state-owned Bank of North Dakota, other rural cooperatives and the city of Carrington, where the cooperative was based." Some government leaders felt strongly that these entities should also benefit from the sale.

Ernst and Young (now EY) selected Dalrymple as the 2007 Master Winner Award Winner Upper Midwest Region, for his work in helping to found and guide Dakota Growers Pasta Company.

Volunteer service
In 1975, Dalrymple helped to found ShareHouse Inc., a residential treatment program for those recovering from alcohol or drug dependencies, in Fargo.

During the 1980s, Dalrymple served on the Casselton (ND) Jobs Development Commission.

In the 1990s, Dalrymple was chairman of the Board for Prairie Public Television (now Prairie Public), the PBS affiliate which also provides radio and public media services serving North Dakota and the surrounding region.

Career in the state legislature
In 1984, he won a seat in the North Dakota House of Representatives. He won re-election in 1986, 1988, 1990, 1992, 1994, 1996, and 1998. He represented rural Casselton, Cass County.

He served as chairman of the House Appropriations Committee for four years. In the 1999-2000 interim, he also chaired the Budget Section, the legislative panel charged with reviewing spending issues between sessions.

U.S. Senate elections

1988

In December 1987, Dalrymple announced he would run for the U.S. Senate. He lost the Republican nomination to state House majority leader Earl Strinden. Strinden lost the general election to incumbent Democratic U.S. senator Quentin Burdick.

1992

On September 8, 1992, Burdick died. Governor George Sinner appointed Burdick's widow Jocelyn Burdick to fill the vacancy until a special election was held. She was not a candidate for election to the rest of the term. On September 17, 1992, Dalrymple announced he would run in the special election. In October 1992, he won the Republican nomination. Kent Conrad, who held North Dakota's other Senate seat at the time but had planned to retire from it (he decided to run to fill the Burdick vacancy), defeated Dalrymple 63–34%. Dalrymple only won three counties in the state: Billings, McIntosh, and Sheridan.

Lieutenant Governor of North Dakota
Dalrymple was elected as Lieutenant Governor of North Dakota in 2000 on the Republican ticket with John Hoeven. He was re-elected as Lieutenant Governor in 2004 and 2008 along with then-Governor Hoeven.

Governor of North Dakota
Then-Lt. Governor Dalrymple became governor following the resignation of John Hoeven, who was elected to the U.S. Senate on November 2, 2010. The transition took place in accordance with the gubernatorial succession provisions of the Constitution of North Dakota. Two days later, on November 4, 2010, Dalrymple designated now-former U.S. attorney for North Dakota Drew Wrigley as his successor to become Lieutenant Governor, once his transition to the governor's office was completed.

On December 7, 2010, Hoeven officially tendered his resignation as governor to Alvin Jaeger, the North Dakota secretary of state. Later that day, in front of a joint session of the North Dakota Legislative Assembly and before a statewide television audience, Dalrymple was sworn in as governor, and then Wrigley was sworn in as lieutenant governor.

On November 1, 2011, Governor Dalrymple announced on a multi city tour of North Dakota that he would run for a full four-year term as governor, with Wrigley as his running mate. In 2012, Dalrymple handily defeated Democratic challenger Ryan Taylor in the general election to serve a full term as governor.

North Dakota does not have a term limit for governor or lieutenant governor, meaning that any individual could be elected to and serve an unlimited number of terms.

On August 24, 2015, Governor Dalrymple announced that he would not seek reelection in 2016.

Personal life
Dalrymple married the former Betsy Wood in 1971, and they have four daughters.

Electoral history

2016 Dakota Access Pipeline protests
In 2016, a series of protests was held against the Dakota Access Pipeline (DAPL), by groups including ReZpect Our Water and Native American tribes including the Standing Rock Sioux. Dalrymple called in the North Dakota National Guard's 191st Military Police to deal with protesters.

See also
 1992 United States Senate special election in North Dakota

References

External links
Governor Jack Dalrymple official North Dakota government website
Jack Dalrymple for Governor

|-

|-

|-

|-

|-

|-

1948 births
20th-century American businesspeople
20th-century American politicians
21st-century American politicians
American Presbyterians
Farmers from North Dakota
Republican Party governors of North Dakota
Lieutenant Governors of North Dakota
Living people
Republican Party members of the North Dakota House of Representatives
People from Cass County, North Dakota
Yale College alumni
Candidates in the 1988 United States elections
Candidates in the 1992 United States elections